Kevin McCann is the name of:

Kevin McCann (footballer, born 1953), Scottish footballer
Kevin McCann (footballer, born 1980), Scottish footballer
Kevin McCann (footballer, born 1987), Scottish footballer
Kevin C. McCann, American author and academic